Arlindo Gomes Furtado CSSp (born 15 November 1949 in Santa Catarina) is the Cape Verdean Catholic bishop of the Diocese of Santiago de Cabo Verde, since 2009, and was the first bishop of the Diocese of Mindelo, from 2004 to 2009. In 2015, he was appointed as the first Cape Verdean cardinal by Pope Francis.

Biography
Arlindo Gomes Furtado was born in Figueira das Naus, a village of the municipality of Santa Catarina, to Ernesto Robaldo Gomes and his mother Maria Furtado; he was later baptized in August 1951.  He studied at a primary school in nearby Achada Lem.  He studied at the Seminary of São José in Praia on October 1, 1962, where he finished his secondary education.

Ecclesiastical career
On September 11, 1971, Bishop Furtado headed for Coimbra, Portugal and pursued his theological studies, and returned to Cape Verde in 1976 where he was ordained a priest in the Roman Catholic Church on 18 July 1976. He was appointed as parish vicar of Nossa Senhora da Graça, from 1978 to 1986, he was rector at the Seminary of São José. He went to Rome in 1986 and later returned to Cape Verde in 1990 and returned to the city's seminary. For a year, he helped the areas of Achada São Filipe, later, he Taught English at Liceu Domingos Ramos. From 1991 to 1995, Taught at the Theological Studies Institute in Coimbra, after he returned to Cape Verde. On 14 November 2003, by nomination of Pope John Paul II, he became the first bishop of the newly created diocese of Mindelo. He was consecrated on 22 February 2004, by the bishop of Cape Verde, Paulino do Livramento Évora becoming the 34th bishop of Cape Verde. The Diocese of Mindelo, according to the Vatican Information Service (VIS), has an area of 2,230 km2, a total population of 166,000, 149,230 Catholics, 19 priests and 58 religious.

On 15 August 2009, Bishop Furtado formally took the role of bishop of the Santiago Diocese, one of the oldest Dioceses in Africa, after being appointed by Pope Benedict XVI on 22 July of that year.

On 25 January 2011, VIS reported that Pope Benedict XVI had appointed Father Ildo Augusto dos Santos Lopes Flores, "fidei donum" priest, chancellor of the diocese, and pastor of the parish of São Vicente, as the second bishop of the Diocese of Mindelo. The bishop-elect was born in Sal, Cape Verde in 1962, and ordained a priest in 1992.

On 4 January 2015, Pope Francis announced that he would make him a cardinal on 14 February. Bishop Furtado became the first Cape Verdean cardinal, at the same time that others became the first cardinals from Tonga and Myanmar. Cape Verde and Ethiopia were two African countries with bishops appointed as new cardinals in Pope Francis' announcement. At the ceremony, he was assigned the titular church of San Timoteo.

In April 2015 he was appointed a member of the Congregation for the Evangelization of Peoples; and of the Pontifical Council Cor Unum. He will hold these memberships until his 80th birthday. In addition to this he was appointed a member of the Congregation for Divine Worship and the Discipline of the Sacraments in October 2016.

See also
Cardinals created by Pope Francis

References

External links
 

1949 births
Living people
People from Santa Catarina, Cape Verde
21st-century Roman Catholic bishops in Cape Verde
Roman Catholic bishops of Santiago de Cabo Verde
Cape Verdean cardinals
Cardinals created by Pope Francis
Members of the Congregation for the Evangelization of Peoples
Holy Ghost Fathers